Palenque  is a corregimiento in Santa Isabel District, Colón Province, Panama with a population of 404 as of 2010. It is the seat of Santa Isabel District. Its population as of 1990 was 281; its population as of 2000 was 400.

References

Corregimientos of Colón Province